Gunnebo is a locality situated in Västervik Municipality, Kalmar County, Sweden. In 2010 Gunnebo had 938 inhabitants.

References 

Populated places in Kalmar County
Populated places in Västervik Municipality